Sherpur-3 is a constituency represented in the Jatiya Sangsad (National Parliament) of Bangladesh since 2008 by A. K. M. Fazlul Haque of the Awami League.

Boundaries 
The constituency encompasses Jhenaigati and Sreebardi upazilas.

History 
The constituency was created in 1984 from the Mymensingh-6 constituency when the former Mymensingh District was split into four districts: Mymensingh, Sherpur, Netrokona, and Kishoreganj.

Members of Parliament

Elections

Elections in the 2010s

Elections in the 2000s

Elections in the 1990s

References

External links
 

Parliamentary constituencies in Bangladesh
Sherpur District